Morgan Kendall Penfold (born 3 December 1998) is an English former professional footballer who played as a striker. He retired in 2021 due to injury and now works for Mick George Group in Peterborough.

Club career
After an eight-year spell in the Peterborough United academy, Penfold made his first-team debut during a 6–1 EFL Trophy defeat against Norwich City U23s, replacing Marcus Maddison in the 72nd minute.

In October 2016, Penfold joined Southern League Premier Division side St Ives Town on a youth loan. On 22 October 2016, Penfold made his St Ives debut in their 4–1 away defeat against Hitchin Town, replacing Jordan Jarrold. Penfold went onto make eleven more league appearances for St Ives before returning to Peterborough in January 2017.

After several further loan spells, including a return to St Ives Town in 2019, he was released by Peterborough United at the end of the 2018–19 season.

Penfold then joined National League side Barrow, signing an initial two-year deal on 15 May 2019, forming part of their promotion winning side in 2020. In October 2020, he joined F.C. United of Manchester on a three month loan deal.

Career statistics

References

External links
Morgan Penfold at Footballdatabase

1998 births
Living people
English footballers
Association football forwards
Peterborough United F.C. players
St Ives Town F.C. players
Biggleswade Town F.C. players
Boston United F.C. players
Hitchin Town F.C. players
Bedford Town F.C. players
Barrow A.F.C. players
English Football League players
National League (English football) players
Southern Football League players
Northern Premier League players